The 1994 amendment to the Constitution of Argentina was approved on 22 August 1994 by a Constitutional Assembly that met in the twin cities of Santa Fe and Paraná. The calling for elections for the Constitutional Convention and the main issues to be decided were agreed in 1993 between President Carlos Menem, and former president and leader of the opposition, Raúl Alfonsín.

Constitutional Assembly election 

On April 10, 1994 the conventional constituent elections were held. The Justicialist Party led by President Menem won the elections with 38.50% of the votes. Radical Civic Union came second with a scant 19.74%, while two newly born forces each obtained 13%: the progressive peronist Broad Front, led by Carlos Álvarez, and the rightist Movement for Dignity and Independence, led by the carapintada military man Aldo Rico.

Out of a total of 305 constituents, the Justicialist Party obtained 137 representatives, Radical Civic Union 74, Broad Front 31, Movement for Dignity and Independence 21, Union of the Democratic Center 4, Socialist Party 3, Republican Force 7 , Progressive Democratic Party 3 and various provincial parties 28.

Ratification
The Constitutional Reform Convention was chaired by Osvaldo Mercuri of the Justicialist Party.

On August 22, 1994, after three months of deliberations in the cities of Santa Fe (traditional seat of constitutional conventions) and Paraná, the reform of 43 articles was finally approved in Santa Fe. The deliberations did not end without altercations; for instance, Monsignor Jaime de Nevares resigned his seat, claiming the convention to be "vitiated with absolute nullity".

Main points
Amongst the most important points of the reform are:
 Argentina ratifies its legitimate and non-prescribing sovereignty over the Falkland Islands under Temporary Provisions 
The international legislation on human rights, and every other International Treaty ratified or to be ratified by Argentina, was deemed to hold an equal status to the Constitution as supreme law.
The length of the presidential term was shortened from six to four years. The reelection of the president and the vice-president was allowed once consecutively, and the requirement for the president and vice-president to be Roman Catholics was removed.
The presidential elections, formerly by the indirect vote of an electoral college became a direct election, with a modified two-round ballotage system.
The terms of senators were also shortened, from nine to six years. It was also established that every district was to elect three senators (up from the previous two) by direct elections (instead of being elected by provincial legislatures).
The capital city, Buenos Aires, was given the special status of Autonomous City (Ciudad Autónoma), and its population was given the right to elect a Chief of Government (i.e. Mayor).
The doctrine of de facto government was repealed, and it was established that any further attempt at breaking the constitutional order was to be deemed illegal, as severe penalties were to be established for the perpetrators and the right to resist a coup d'état was validated.
The office of Chief of the Cabinet of Ministers was established, with the intention of attenuating the strong Presidentialist character of the Argentine government
An independent institution, called the Judiciary Council, was established with mandate to administer, regulate and control the functioning of the judiciary, to select the candidates for Federal Justicies, and to initiate impeachments to depose them. It is composed of members from both houses of the National Congress, officials selected by the President, and representatives from the legal profession, judges and the academics.
The issuing of Necessity and Urgency Decrees was regulated.
An independent office, that of ombudsman, was created.

Other specific provisions

In order to provide an effective protection to individual rights, the 1994 amendment has introduced actions called: "amparo" (injunctions), "hábeas corpus", and "hábeas data". "Amparo" gives the possibility to any person to request that a judge declare the unconstitutionality of an act or ruling on which an action or omission of public authorities or private individuals is based that, in an actual or imminent manner, causes damage or restrains a right recognized by the Constitution, the law, or an international treaty. This action requires that no other effective judicial means be available. "Hábeas corpus" is an action that can be filled to protect the right of physical freedom when it is threatened, limited, modified, or injured, or in case of illegitimate aggravation of conditions of detention. "Hábeas data" is an action that can be filled by any individual to take notice of any information referred to him, registered in public or private registers, and to request its suppression, rectification, confidentiality, or updating.

Another innovation introduced by the 1994 amendment is the right of citizens to introduce bills before the House of Deputies that must be considered by Congress within the next twelve months. A further innovative provision is the recognition of the right of every inhabitant to a healthy environment in article 41 that establishes that

Additionally, there are precise provisions referring to protection of consumers rights, defense of competition, control of natural or legal monopolies, and of public services' quality and efficiency.

References

Presidency of Carlos Menem
Constitutions of Argentina
Argentina
Amendment Of The Argentine Constitution, 1994
Amendment Of The Argentine Constitution, 1994
Amendment Of The Argentine Constitution, 1994